Friedrich Graf von Beck-Rzikowsky (21 March 1830 – 9 March 1920), sometimes Friedrich Beck, was an Austrian Generaloberst and Chief of the general staff of the Imperial and Royal army from 1881 to 1906.

Beck was born at Freiburg im Breisgau, and entered the army of the Austrian Empire in 1848. He distinguished himself as chief-of-staff of an infantry division at the Battle of Magenta, and in 1863 was made personal aide-de-camp to the Emperor. He held this position, with that of adjutant-general and chief of the imperial military chancery until 1881, winning the Emperor's confidence and exercising the greatest influence on all military questions.

In 1866 he acted as the Emperor's confidential agent at the headquarters of Feldzeugmeister Ludwig von Benedek, before and after the Battle of Königgrätz, and his advice was of great importance, though it was not always followed. In 1878 he was entrusted with a similar mission to the commander-in-chief of the troops operating in Bosnia. In 1881 he was made chief of the general staff of the Imperial and Royal army, a position which he occupied until 1906. Not only was his advice listened to in military affairs, but he frequently exercised great influence on important political and personal questions, gaining a great reputation throughout the monarchy as one of its most influential men. His clear judgment and practical common-sense enabled him to see and judge men and things from a purely objective standpoint.

He retired at the age of 77, and was appointed commander of the Imperial Guard.

Orders and decorations

Notes

References

Further reading
Scott W. Lackey. The Rebirth of the Habsburg Army: Friedrich Beck and the Rise of the General Staff. Greenwood, 1995.

1830 births
1920 deaths
Counts of Austria
Austrian generals
People of the Austro-Prussian War
Military personnel from Freiburg im Breisgau
Grand Crosses of the Order of Saint Stephen of Hungary
Knights Grand Cross of the Order of Saints Maurice and Lazarus
Recipients of the Order of the Crown (Italy)
Grand Crosses of the Military Merit Order (Bavaria)
Recipients of the Order of the Medjidie, 2nd class
Grand Cordons of the Order of the Rising Sun
Grand Croix of the Légion d'honneur
Grand Crosses of the Order of the Star of Romania